Lucien Campeau (June 20, 1927March 15, 2010) was a Canadian cardiologist. He was a full professor at the Université de Montréal. He is best known for performing the world's first transradial coronary angiogram. Campeau was one of the founding staff of the Montreal Heart Institute, joining in 1957. He is also well known for developing the Canadian Cardiovascular Society grading of angina pectoris.

Education
Campeau received his M.D. degree from the University of Laval in 1953 and completed a fellowship in Cardiology at Johns Hopkins Hospital from 1956-57. He later became a professor at University of Montreal in 1961 and was one of the co-founders of the Montreal Heart Institute.

In his lifetime, Campeau was awarded the Research Achievement Award of the Canadian Cardiovascular Society. In 2004, he was named “Cardiologue émérite 2004” by the Association des cardiologues du Québec.

References

Further reading

Burt Cohen http://www.ptca.org/news/2010/0401_CAMPEAU_RADIAL.html angioplasty.org (April 2010)

1927 births
2010 deaths
Canadian cardiologists
Université Laval alumni
Academic staff of the Université de Montréal
People from Greater Sudbury